The 1960 American Football League draft was held on November 23–24, 1959, in Minneapolis,  shortly after the organization of the league, and lasted 33 rounds.  An additional draft of 20 rounds was held by the AFL on December 2. 

Teams were required to fill the 11 squad positions by selecting four backs, two ends, two tackles, two guards, and a center with their first 11 picks. Before each position was selected, teams drew lots to determine the selection order. Though professional teams used dedicated offensive and defensive units, the league did not want to go 22 rounds before starting unrestricted drafting.

Territorial draft
The first territorial or "bonus" picks for each team were:

 Boston Patriots ~ Gerhard Schwedes, HB, Syracuse
 Buffalo Bills ~ Richie Lucas, QB, Penn State
 Dallas Texans ~ Don Meredith, QB, SMU
 Denver Broncos ~ Roger LeClerc, C, Trinity
 Houston Oilers ~ Billy Cannon, HB, LSU
 Los Angeles Chargers ~ Monty Stickles, E, Notre Dame
 New York Titans ~ George Izo, QB, Notre Dame
 Minneapolis AFL team 1 ~ Dale Hackbart, QB, Wisconsin

Source:

Regular draft

 
 

 
 

 
 

Source:

Allocation draft
For the allocation draft, the other seven AFL teams each froze eleven players, and Oakland selected a total of 24 players from the ranks of the other teams' "unfrozen" lists.  The number of players originally drafted for the eighth AFL franchise, but who were signed by other teams, combined with the process of the allocation draft, virtually guaranteed that the Raiders would have the worst team in the AFL in its first year.  In spite of this, they managed to sign future stars Jim Otto and Wayne Hawkins, two men who played the entire ten years of the American Football League.

Source:

Future Hall of Famers selected by AFL teams
Jim Otto 1, Center, Miami Hurricanes football – Taken as a "First Selections" by the AFL's Minnesota franchise and retained by the Oakland Raiders.  Inducted in 1980.
Ron Mix 1, Offensive Tackle, USC – Taken as a "First Selections" by the AFL's Boston Patriots.  Inducted in 1979.
Johnny Robinson 1, Defensive back – Dallas Texans, "First Selections", LSU

Other notable players selected by AFL teams
Tom Day, Defensive End – Buffalo Bills, "Second Selection", North Carolina A&T
Larry Grantham, Linebacker – New York Titans, "First Selections", Mississippi
Abner Haynes 2, Halfback – Dallas Texans, "First Selections", North Texas State
1 Member of the American Football League All-Time Team.
2 1960 AFL Rookie of the Year and Most Valuable Player.

Notable undrafted players

See also
List of American Football League players
History of American Football League draft
List of professional American football drafts

References

External links
 1960 American Football League draft list – RememberTheAFL.com

1960
Draft
American Football League draft
American Football League draft
American Football League draft
20th century in Minneapolis
American football in Minneapolis
Events in Minneapolis